Elvira Abdić-Jelenović (born 7 September 1967) is a Bosnian politician and Croat representative in the House of Peoples of the Parliament of the Federation of Bosnia and Herzegovina. She is the president of the Labour Party of Bosnia and Herzegovina, founded in 2013. Prior to that, she was a long-year member of the Democratic People's Union, a party founded by her father Fikret Abdić, from which she and her father were banned after internal changes within the party.

Biography
Abdić-Jelenović was born in Karlovac. Her father is the Bosnian politician and businessman, Fikret Abdić. 

Abdić Jelenović studied at the Faculty of Civil Engineering at the University of Rijeka. In 2006 she was elected to the Federal Parliament as a Croat representative in the House of Peoples.

References

Living people
1967 births
People from Karlovac
Bosnia and Herzegovina politicians
Bosnia and Herzegovina Muslims
Croatian Muslims
Democratic People's Union politicians

Bosniaks of Croatia